Mastic is a hamlet and a census-designated place (CDP) in the southeastern part of the town of Brookhaven in central Suffolk County, New York, United States. The population was 15,481 at the 2010 census.

The hamlet was originally called Forge until 1893, when it was changed to the current name of Mastic.
 
The Poospatuck Indian Reservation lies entirely within the community, near its southern end and along the Forge River.

The northernmost section of the hamlet is called Manor Park, which stretches from Sunrise Highway to Moriches-Middle Island Road immediately east of Brookhaven Airport. Part of the neighborhood lies within the hamlet of Shirley, but is served entirely by Mastic's zip code of 11950.

Within Long Islanders, the Mastic, Mastic Beach and Shirley area is known for being impoverished, filled with crime and abandoned houses. As of 2023, downtown Mastic Beach is known for having an unfriendly, unsafe characteristic, as with most of the “Tri Hamlet” area(Mastic, Mastic Beach and Shirley).

Geography

Demographics

Demographics of the CDP
At the 2010 census there were 15,481 people, 4,526 households, and 3,743 families in the CDP. The population density was 3,969.5 per square mile (1,532.8/km). There were 4,847 housing units at an average density of 1,242.8/sq mi (479.9/km). The racial makeup of the CDP was 46.1% White, 22.4% African American, 0.7% Native American, 2.1% Asian, 0.1% Pacific Islander, 7.2% some other race, and 4.3% from two or more races. Hispanic or Latino of any race were 21.8%.

There were 4,526 households, 48.8% had children under the age of 18 living with them, 57.7% were headed by married couples living together, 18.3% had a female householder with no husband present, and 17.3% were non-families. 12.4% of households were one person and 3.3% were someone living alone who was 65 or older. The average household size was 3.41, and the average family size was 3.63.

The age distribution was 28.3% under the age of 18, 10.9% from 18 to 24, 28.4% from 25 to 44, 26.1% from 45 to 64, and 6.3% 65 or older, and the median age was 33.1 years. For every 100 females, there were 100.1 males and for every 100 females age 18 and over, there were 97.7 males.

From 2007 to 2011, the median annual income for a household in Mastic was $70,979, and the median family income  was $79,839. Males had a median income of $51,315 versus $40,581 for females. The per capita income for the CDP was $26,176. About 18% of families and 22% of the population were below the poverty threshold, including 6.6% of those under age 18 and 6.0% of those age 65 or over.

Education 
Mastic is served mostly by the William Floyd School District, but also the Eastport-South Manor Central School District north of Grove Drive in the Manor Park section of the hamlet.

Media 
 Tri Hamlet News

See also 
Forge River
Moriches Bay
Moriches Inlet
Smith Point Bridge

References

External links 

 Forge River Inlet at Marinas.com
 Old Mastic RR Station

Brookhaven, New York
Hamlets in New York (state)
Census-designated places in New York (state)
Census-designated places in Suffolk County, New York
Hamlets in Suffolk County, New York
Populated coastal places in New York (state)